Cougar Mountain is a summit in the Elbow River Valley, Kananaskis Country, Alberta, Canada.

Cougar Mountain was named after the animal.

References

Two-thousanders of Alberta
Alberta's Rockies